The Canadian Journal of Nursing Research is a nursing journal published by SAGE Publishing. Its primary goal is to publish original nursing research that develops a basic knowledge for the discipline and examines the application of the knowledge in practice.

See also 
 List of nursing journals

General nursing journals
Publications established in 1968